Ethel Ann Burton-Brown, née Marshall (1868-1927) was an English educator. She was headmistress of Prior's Field School from 1908 to 1927.

Life
Ethel Marshall was born in Hertford in 1868. She was the daughter of the Rev. Charles Marshall and Elizabeth Mary Tripe, later Metham. She was educated at Highfield School, Hendon, the girls school set up by Fanny Metcalfe. In 1886 she went up to Girton College, Cambridge. Though she initially wanted to study classics, her Girton tutors persuaded her to switch to history. She was taught by Gwatkin and Mandell Creighton, who both became friends and mentors to her. She achieved a first-class in her examination, though as a woman was denied a Cambridge degree.

She married a doctor, Frederick Hewlett Burton-Brown, and moved to India with him when he joined the Indian Army Medical Service. Her first two children were born there, Beatrice and Margaret, who died in infancy. On returning to London, she worked at the Women's University Settlement in Southwark. In 1896 her husband bought a medical practice in Rome, and the family moved there. There she came to know the archaeologist Giacomo Boni, and wrote an English guidebook to Boni's excavations of the Roman Forum. She also gained extensive knowledge of Italian painting. Twin boys, Christopher and Theodore, were born in Italy. In 1904 Frederick was forced to give up his medical practice, and the family returned to England. After Frederick had made several unsuccessful attempts to set up an English practice, the marriage failed. A judicial separation between Frederick and Ethel Ann was drawn up, and Frederick left the family to move abroad.

Forced to earn an income, Ethel Burton Brown took up lecturing. After lecturing in Cambridge on the recent Roman Forum excavations, she was made an Honorary Fellow of the Cambridge Classical Society and the Royal Historical Society. From 1905 she started giving regular weekly lectures on Italian art at Prior's Field School, founded in 1902 by Julia Huxley. Befriending Huxley, Burton-Brown became joint headmistress with her in April 1906, and took over as sole headmistress after Huxley's health failed. For the next two decades she dedicated herself to the school.

Ethel Burton Brown died on 21 March 1927. She is buried near Huxley at Compton, Guildford. Her daughter Beatrice (1892-1964) succeeded her as headmistress of the school.

Works
 Recent excavations in the Roman Forum, 1898-1904. London: Murray, 1904.

References

1868 births
1927 deaths
Alumni of Girton College, Cambridge
Heads of schools in England
Women heads of schools in the United Kingdom